Petter Pettersen Dass (c. 1647 – 17 August 1707) was a Lutheran priest and the foremost Norwegian poet of his generation, writing both baroque hymns and topographical poetry.

Biography
He was born at Northern Herøy (Dønna), Nordland, Norway. His father was a merchant originally from Dundee, Scotland, Peter Dundas who had established himself as a trader along the northern Norwegian coast. His mother was Maren Falch (1629–1709) whose father had been the local bailiff, a large land owner in  Helgeland and manager for the Dønnes estate of Henrik Rantzau. His father died in 1653, when Petter was 6, and the children were cared for by relatives and friends. His mother remarried, but Petter remained with his mother's sister, Anna Falck, who was married to the priest at Nærøy.

At 13, Petter  began  attending school in Bergen, and later studied theology at the University of Copenhagen. He was lonely during his years in Copenhagen, but intellectually stimulated. After his years in Copenhagen, he returned to Norway and became a tutor in Vefsn. He fathered a child out of wedlock, and had to travel to Copenhagen and seek pardon from King Christian V of Denmark and Norway. In 1689, he was appointed parish priest at Alstahaug Church.  His parish was quite large covering an area which included the villages of  Hattfjelldal, Vevelstad, Leirfjord, Vefsn, Herøy, Dønna, Nesna, Hemnes and Rana.

He was also a writer of texts and hymns. Most of his writings were not published until after his death.  His most famous work is the versified topographical description of northern Norway, Nordlands Trompet ("The Trumpet of Nordland"), and some psalms still in use, most prominently Herre Gud, ditt dyre navn og ære ("Good Lord, thy precious name and glory"). In the Faroe Islands, which were Norwegian until 1814, his Bibelsk Viise-Bog and Katechismus-Sange have continued to be used among folk singers until the last decades of the 20th century.

The only existing portrait of Petter Dass is traditionally believed to be one found in the Melhus church in Norway. However, the claim is hotly disputed, with some historians who studied the painting concluding that Dass is most likely not the subject. Several modern statues and bust of Petter Dass have been erected in Norway, including a bas-relief by Norwegian sculptor Ambrosia Theodora Tønnesen (1859-1948) at the Bergen Cathedral. The community of Sandnessjøen has a modern statue of Petter Dass located prominently in the town centre.

Petter Dass was deeply mourned after his death, and many fishing vessels of Northern Norway carried a black cloth in their sail for 100 years after his death, as a sign of mourning.  He is still the subject of folklore of Nordland. There is, for example, a legend of how he fooled the devil to carry him to Copenhagen to preach for the king.

Petter Dass Chapel
Petter Dass Chapel (Petter Dass-kapellet) is located in Husøya,  the administrative centre of Træna municipality, in Nordland county, Norway. The chapel was opened on 28 June 1997  as a memorial of Petter Dass.

Petter Dass Prize
Petter Dass Prize (Petter Dass-prisen) is an annual award extended by the Norwegian newspaper Vårt Land. the prize was first granted during 1995. It is awarded in recognition of a person or organization that has helped to put the Christian faith on the agenda in society.

Petter Dass Medal
The Petter Dass Medal (Petter Dass medaljen) is an award given annually by Nordlændingernes Forening in Oslo to people from Northern Norway that have distinguished themselves in their work for the region's development. The society is a fraternal association of people that have emigrated from the counties of Nordland, Troms, and Finnmark. Nordlændingernes Forening was founded by the Norwegian educator, clergyman, and engineer Ole Tobias Olsen (18 August 1830 – 6 July 1924)  and the Norwegian theologian and hymn writer Elias Blix. In honor of the society's 50th anniversary in 1912, a commemorative medal was first established in memory of Petter Dass.

Petter Dass Museum
The Petter Dass Museum (Petter Dass-museet) in Alstahaug municipality in Nordland county, Norway was established in 1966 and is currently a division of Helgeland Museum. The opening of the new museum building took place during Autumn 2007, 300 years after the death of Petter Dass. The facility  inspires the teaching, research, artistic creative work, study and contemplation, and dialogue about culture and values. Since 1983, Petter Dass  has also been honored with the traditional Petter Dass days at Alstahaug.

Modern cultural influence
Noted Norwegian Classical songwriter Edvard Grieg included the words of Petter Dass in his composition Fisherman's Song (Fiskervise. 1894)  from 7 Barnlige Sange, Op.61. More recently  Norwegian folk singer, Jack Berntsen has written  songs based on poems by Petter Dass and    Norwegian playwright  Lars Berg wrote the play  Petter Dass  (1967). Mit navn er Petter Dass, a music album published in 2008 with lyrics by Petter Dass, was written by Kari Bremnes with her brothers Lars and Ola.

Collected works 

 Samlede Skrifter (1874-1877)
 Volume 1 (1874)
 Volume 2 (1875)
 Volume 3 (1877)
 Samlede verker (1980)

See also
Dorothe Engelbretsdotter

References

Other sources 
Andersen,  Per Thomas (1997) Fra Petter Dass til Jan Kjærstad: Studier i diktekunst og komposisjon (Cappelen akademisk forlag)  
Akslen, Laila (1998) Norsk barokk: Dorothe Engelbrettsdatter og Petter Dass i retorisk tradisjon (Oslo: Cappelen) 
Apenes,  Sverre Inge  (1978)  Rapport om Petter Dass: Presten som diktet makt til folket (Gyldendal)  
Forfang, Sven Erik (1999) Som siges at præsten paa Næsne har gjord" : søkelys på Petter Dass' liv og verk  (Høgskolen i Nesna) 
Hansen, Kåre  (2006)  Petter Dass, mennesket, makten og mytene 
Harr, Karl Erik  (1988)  Guds nordenvind : vandringer med Petter Dass (Cappelen) 
Midbøe,  Hans (1947)  Petter Dass (Gyldendal)  
Nesset,  Sigmund (1997) ‘Herr Petter 350 år : et festskrift fra Universitetet i Tromsø  (Universitetsbiblioteket i Tromsø) 
Ustvedt, Yngvar  (1976)  Pa tomannshand med dikterne: Nye intervjuer med norske klassikere fra Petter Dass til Arnulf Øverland (Gyldendal)

External links 

 link to all his works, at UiO.no
Statue of Petter Dass  in Sandnessjøen, Norway

1647 births
1707 deaths
People from Dønna
People educated at the Bergen Cathedral School
Norwegian Lutheran hymnwriters
18th-century Norwegian Lutheran clergy
17th-century Norwegian poets
18th-century Norwegian poets
17th-century Norwegian Lutheran clergy